Chicago-style relish is a type of sweet pickle relish typically used on Chicago-style hot dogs. The unique color of the relish, often referred to as "neon green", is created by adding blue dye to regular pickle relish. The first use of Chicago-style relish on a hot dog has been attributed to several different restaurants, including Fluky's and Superdawg.

References

Further reading
 

Condiments
Cuisine of Chicago
Hot dogs